Jan Kristian Fjærestad (born 4 September 1963) is a retired Norwegian football striker. He played for Moss F.K., and became the Norwegian Premier League's top goalscorer with 18 goals in 1987, the season Moss won the league title.

The same year Fjærestad was called up to represent the national team by the new coach Tord Grip. Fjærestad was capped seven times, scoring once.

References

External links

1963 births
Living people
Norwegian footballers
Norway international footballers
Eliteserien players
Moss FK players

Association football forwards